Parangaba  is a neighborhood of Fortaleza in Ceará, Brazil. It was an independent city, but Fortaleza developed, expanded and Parangaba has become to a part of that city. There is a lake with the same name and since 1993 a big famous flea market, called "Feira dos Pássaros", which means "Bird Market", in a free translation.

References

Neighbourhoods in Fortaleza